Enzo Martínez Scarpe (born 15 August 1994), also written as Enzo Martínez-Scarpe , is a Uruguayan swimmer.

Early life
Originally from Maldonado, Martínez was diagnosed with asthma as a child and took up swimming at the suggestion of a doctor. He enrolled at the University of Florida in 2014, where he swam for the Gators and competed alongside Caeleb Dressel.

Career
He competed in the men's 100 metre freestyle event at the 2017 World Aquatics Championships.

In 2019, he represented Uruguay at the 2019 World Aquatics Championships held in Gwangju, South Korea and finished in 47th place in the heats of the men's 50 metre freestyle event. In the men's 100 metre freestyle he finished in 62nd place in the heats. At the 2021 South American Swimming Championships, Martínez became the first Uruguayan to medal at the event in more than thirty years when he took gold in the 50 metre freestyle — breaking a national record in the process.

See also
 List of Uruguayan records in swimming

References

External links
 

1994 births
Living people
Uruguayan male freestyle swimmers
Place of birth missing (living people)
Swimmers at the 2019 Pan American Games
Pan American Games competitors for Uruguay
Swimmers at the 2020 Summer Olympics
Olympic swimmers of Uruguay
Florida Gators men's swimmers